Eileen Wilks is an American fiction writer living in Midland, Texas.

Biography 
Eileen Wilks moved from West Texas to the town of Norman, OK in the summer of 2012, and has previously lived in Canada and Venezuela, as well as twelve U.S. cities in five states.

Wilks' first book, a Silhouette Desire titled The Loner and the Lady (1996), hit the USA Today Bestseller List at #146 on May 30, 1996 and was nominated for the 1996 Romantic Times Best First Short Contemporary award.
Since then, she hit the New York Times Bestsellers list 
 
with her novel Blood Challenge (2011) in her current series, World of the Lupi, in which werewolves and magic exist in an earth much like our own.

Bibliography

Series 

Dynasties: The Ashtons (including Entangled)
Dynasties: The Barons (including With Private Eyes)
Dynasties: The Connellys (including Expecting...and in Danger)
Just A Little Bit (including Just a Little Bit Pregnant, Just a Little Bit Married)
At Midnight (including Midnight Cinderella, Midnight Promises, Midnight Choices,  and Meeting at Midnight)
Tall, Dark & Eligible (including Jacob's Proposal, Luke's Promise, Michael's Temptation)
World of the Lupi (see article below for list)

Lupi titles (in reading order)
0.1 The New Kid free short story (September 2013) 
0.2 Only Human in the Lover Beware anthology (July 2003) 
1 Tempting Danger (October 2004) 
1.1 Originally Human in the Cravings anthology (July 2004) , ISBN (e-book): 978-1101578568
2 Mortal Danger (November 2005) 
2.1 Brownies deleted scene from Blood Lines (January 2007) 
3 Blood Lines (January 2007) 
3.1 Inhuman in the On the Prowl anthology (August 2007) , ISBN (e-book): 978-1101578582
4 Night Season (January 2008) 
4.2 Good Counsel deleted scene from Night Season (January 2008) ISBN N/A
4.5 Cyncerely Yours free short story (January 2008) ISBN N/A
5 Mortal Sins (February 2009) 
5.1 Human Nature in the Inked anthology (January 2010) 
6 Blood Magic (February 2010) 
7 Blood Challenge (January 2011) 
8 Death Magic (November 2011) 
8.1 Human Error in the Tied with a Bow anthology (November 2011) 
9 Mortal Ties (October 2012) 
10 Ritual Magic (September 2013) 
11 Unbinding (October 2014) 
12 Mind Magic (November 2015) 
13 Dragon Spawn (December 2016) 
14 Dragon Blood (January 2, 2018) 
All referenced free or bonus stories are available on the author's website.

Romance titles
Entangled (Silhouette Desire #1627, 01/05) 
Meeting at Midnight (Silhouette Desire #1605, 09/04) 
With Private Eyes (Silhouette Desire #1543, 11/03) 
A Matter of Duty (in the Broken Silence anthology, 05/03) 
Midnight Choices (Silhouette Intimate Moments #1210, 03/03) 
Expecting...and in Danger (Silhouette Desire #1472, 11/02) 
Her Lord Protector (Silhouette Intimate Moments #1160, 07/02) 
Michael's Temptation (Silhouette Desire #1409, 12/01) 
Luke's Promise (Silhouette Desire #1403, 11/01) 
Jacob's Proposal (Silhouette Desire #1397, 10/01) 
The Pregnant Heiress (Silhouette Desire #1378, 07/01) 
"The Proper Lover" (in the All I Want for Christmas anthology, 11/00) 
Night of No Return (Silhouette Intimate Moments #1028, 10/00) 
Midnight Promises (Silhouette Intimate Moments #982, 01/00) 
Proposition: Marriage (Silhouette Desire #1239, 09/99) 
Pandora's Bottle (in the Charmed anthology, 08/99) 
Midnight Cinderella (Silhouette Intimate Moments #921, 04/99) 
A Tempting Offer (in the To Tame a Texan anthology, 03/99) 
Just a Little Bit Married (Silhouette Desire, 12/98) 
Simple Sins (in the Rough Around the Edges anthology, 06/98) 
The Virgin and the Outlaw (Silhouette Intimate Moments, 05/98) 
Just a Little Bit Pregnant (Silhouette Desire #1134, 03/98) 
Cowboys Do It Best (Silhouette Desire #1109, 11/97) 
The Wrong Wife (Silhouette Desire #1065, 04/97) 
The Loner and the Lady (Silhouette Desire #1008, 06/96)

References

External links
Official website
Romantic Times Profile

21st-century American novelists
American women novelists
American romantic fiction writers
American science fiction writers
Living people
Women science fiction and fantasy writers
Women romantic fiction writers
21st-century American women writers
1952 births